Distance Inbetween is the eighth studio album by the English indie rock band The Coral. It's their first album after a five-year hiatus, their first without guitarist Lee Southall and also the first with Southall's replacement, Paul Molloy. The album was released on 4 March 2016. The first single, "Chasing the Tail of a Dream", was released on 26 December 2015.

Background
The catalyst for the album and the band's return from hiatus was in 2014 when lead singer and main songwriter James Skelly came up with "Chasing the Tail of a Dream," intending to record it with The Intenders, the backing band for his 2013 debut solo album, Love Undercover which also included The Coral members Ian Skelly, Paul Duffy and Nick Power. When jamming together on the song didn't feel right, Skelly felt it might be more suited to The Coral. Meanwhile, while planning to finally release The Curse of Love, a long-shelved album that they had recorded in between 2005's The Invisible Invasion and 2007's Roots & Echoes, the suggestion came for the band to try making music together again.

Initial songwriting sessions for the album were conducted as a four-piece due to Southall opting out in favor of working on his in-progress solo album, prompting the music to become more rhythm-oriented due to James Skelly being the sole guitarist at the time. After coming up with four new songs, the band brought in Molloy, former guitarist of The Zutons who had recently collaborated with Ian Skelly as Serpent Power.

Recording
The band recorded the album at Liverpool's Parr Street Studios with co-producer Richard Turvey in 2015. The band took a disciplined approach to recording, in which they would arrive at the studio in the morning, work until 10 pm and then go home. Most of the album was recorded live, with overdubs kept to a minimum and the first take (of usually three) often being the chosen one. In total, recording took approximately three weeks, followed a lengthier process of piecing the tracks together.

Composition
Regarding the album's direction, the band wanted the sound to be minimal, direct and groove-based, with musical touchstones including Cypress Hill, Kool Keith, Portishead and Can. The album was also influenced by what Power referred to as "stuff that's happened," including the death of Alan Wills, the band's mentor and founder of Deltasonic Records, in a cycling accident. The band subsequently dedicated the album in memory of Wills.

Promotion
The first single from the album, "Chasing the Tail of a Dream", was released as a free download from the band's website on 26 December 2015. A signed and numbered 7-inch vinyl with the new song "Unforgiven" as the B-side was additionally released. The second single from the album, "Miss Fortune", was released on 20 January 2016, alongside a video produced by the band.

Reception

Distance Inbetween was met with generally favourable reviews from music critics. At Metacritic, which assigns a normalized rating out of 100 to reviews from mainstream publications, the album received an average score of 81, based on 18 reviews. AnyDecentMusic? gave it a score of 7.7, also based on 18 reviews.

Accolades

Track listing
All tracks written by James Skelly, except where noted.

Personnel
Credits adapted from Distance Inbetween liner notes.

The Coral
 James Skelly - lead vocals, guitar
 Ian Skelly - drums, percussion, backing vocals
 Nick Power - keyboards, backing vocals
 Paul Duffy - bass guitar, keyboards, backing vocals
 Paul Molloy - guitar

Additional musicians
 Alfie Skelly - bow (track 10)
 Richard Turvey - keyboard (track 9), guitar (track 11)

Production
 Richard Turvey - production, mixing, engineering
 Ian Skelly - additional engineering (track 10), artwork, additional photography
 Anna Benson - artwork
 Dominic Foster - additional photography
 Mike Snowdon - design, layout

Charts

References

External links
 

2016 albums
The Coral albums